The British School in Colombo (BSC) is an international school in Borella, a suburb of Colombo, Sri Lanka.

History
The British School in Colombo was founded by British educator Elizabeth Moir in 1994. She had previously founded Colombo International School twelve years earlier. In 2005 BSC moved to its current site in Borella.

Curriculum
Students in Key Stage 4 (Years 10 and 11) prepare for the IGCSEs. Compulsory subjects are English Language, English Literature and Mathematics.

Students in Sixth Form prepare for the GCE A Levels. Exams are validated by Cambridge International Examinations. There are four different pathways students may choose based on their intended course of study in university and interests. The following subjects are offered:
Accounting
Art
Biology
Business Studies
Chemistry
Computer Science
Drama and Theatre Studies
Economics
English Literature
French
Further Mathematics
German
History
Mathematics
Physics
Psychology

Notable alumni
Yanushi Dullewe Wijeyeratne, Cardiology Specialty Registrar  with PhD at the St George's University Hospitals NHS Foundation Trust, London, UK & winner of the 2012 Bedi Prize.

References

External links
Official Website

British international schools in Asia
International schools in Sri Lanka
Schools in Colombo
Educational institutions established in 1994
1994 establishments in Sri Lanka